142 Squadron may refer to:

 142 Squadron, Republic of Singapore Air Force
 142 Squadron SAAF, Air Force Mobile Deployment Wing SAAF, South Africa
 No. 142 Squadron RAF, United Kingdom
 142d Aero Squadron, Air Service, United States Army
 142d Airlift Squadron, United States Air Force
 VAQ-142, United States Navy
 VF-142, United States Navy
 VP-142, United States Navy
 VMFA-142, United States Marine Corps